Valkyria is a steel Dive Coaster manufactured by Bolliger & Mabillard operating at Liseberg amusement park in Gothenburg, Sweden. Opened on 10 August 2018, it is Europe's longest and tallest Dive Coaster. The name Valkyria is derived from the Norse mythology creature Valkyrie, a mythological creature that brought fallen warriors to the afterlife.

History 
In the days leading towards the announcement of the investment project starting on September 21, 2016, Liseberg released multiple  trailers for upcoming news to the park in 2017. Less than a week later on September 27, 2016, Liseberg announced the construction of two new attractions, including Valkryia, for the 2017 and 2018 seasons.

The ride's simulated POV was released on April 13, 2017, along with the announcement that construction on the ride's station had begun where Kanonen was located. Furthermore, the park announced that it would host a virtual reality (VR) experience for the ride later in 2017 season. The construction of Valkyria is part of a 250 million SEK investment of the park that will be constructed along with Loke, a Gyro Swing manufactured by Intamin, both being in the theme of Norse mythology.

In January/February 2018, vertical construction of the track began after a year of foundation work was completed for the roller coasters' layout. The ride was intended to open in April 2018, however, due to problems with building the tunnel that had previously arose, the ride was delayed until August. On August 10, 2018, Valkyria opened to the public.

Ride experience
At the top, the train makes a 90° right-hand turn and engages with the holding chain at the drop. After halting for a few seconds, the train is released into its signature  drop into a tunnel, and immediately pulls up into an immelmann inversion. It crosses over the canal into a banked turn and a zero-g roll. A clockwise turnaround helix and a brief dip leads to the final inversion, a lengthened heartline roll, whereas a final right hand turn leads into the final brake run. A final left-hand 180° leads back into the station.

See also 

 2018 in amusement parks

References

External links 

 

Liseberg
Dive Coasters manufactured by Bolliger & Mabillard
Roller coasters in Sweden